Epoxyagroclavine is an ergot alkaloid made by permafrost Penicillium.

References

Ergot alkaloids